Timiskaming North was a Canadian electoral district represented in the House of Commons of Canada for ten years, from 1925 to 1935. It was located in the northeastern part of the province of Ontario. It was created in 1924 from parts of Timiskaming and Algoma West ridings.

It consisted of the northern portion of Timiskaming District and much of the Algoma District

The electoral district was abolished in 1933 when it was redistributed between Timiskaming and Cochrane ridings.

Members of Parliament for Timiskaming North

John Raymond O'Neill, Conservative – 1925–1926
Joseph-Arthur Bradette, Liberal – 1926–1935

Electoral history

|- 
  
|Conservative
|John Raymond O'NEIL
|align="right"| 6,053 
  
|Liberal
|Joseph-Arthur BRADETTE
|align="right"|  5,560 
  
|Liberal
| Charles Vincent GALLAGHER
|align="right"| 3,255   
|}

|- 
  
|Liberal
|Joseph-Arthur BRADETTE
|align="right"| 8,707
  
|Conservative
|John Raymond O'NEIL
|align="right"| 7,553    
|}

|- 
  
|Liberal
|Joseph-Arthur BRADETTE
|align="right"| 9,586
  
|Conservative
|David Alexandre CHENIER
|align="right"|7,022   
|}

See also 

 List of Canadian federal electoral districts
 Past Canadian electoral districts

External links 

 Website of the Parliament of Canada

Former federal electoral districts of Ontario
1924 establishments in Ontario
1933 disestablishments in Ontario